Xiao Zhen may refer to:

 Xiao Zhen (footballer, born 1976), Chinese female footballer
 Xiao Zhen (footballer, born 1987), Chinese male footballer
 Xiao Zhen, convicted murderer, see Trial of Xiao Zhen